Regions of Greece are the 13 current administrative regions of Greece.

Regions of Greece may also refer to:

The regions of ancient Greece
The traditional geographic regions of Greece in the modern era